Adrian Orlin Toader (born 27 July 1973) is a retired Romanian football striker.

Honours
Petrolul Ploiești
Cupa României: 1994–95

References

External links
 
 

1973 births
Living people
Romanian footballers
Liga I players
Liga II players
Swiss Super League players
FC Petrolul Ploiești players
CS Universitatea Craiova players
FCM Câmpina players
CS Gaz Metan Mediaș players
CSM Unirea Alba Iulia players
FC Politehnica Timișoara players
FC Lausanne-Sport players
Qingdao Hainiu F.C. (1990) players
Association football forwards
Romanian expatriate footballers
Expatriate footballers in Switzerland
Romanian expatriate sportspeople in Switzerland
Expatriate footballers in China
Romanian expatriate sportspeople in China
Sportspeople from Ploiești